Sardar Abdul Wahib (12 March 1901 – ?) was an Afghanistan field hockey player, who competed at the 1936 Summer Olympic Games and played in one game.

References

External links
 

Afghan male field hockey players
Olympic field hockey players of Afghanistan
Field hockey players at the 1936 Summer Olympics
1901 births
Year of death missing